(The sleeping beauty in the woods) is an opera in three acts by Ottorino Respighi to a libretto by Gian Bistolfi based on Charles Perrault's fairy tale "Sleeping Beauty".

It was a version written for the Italian marionettist , who was director of a marionette company called Teatro dei Piccoli (Theater for Children). The play was interpreted by marionettes, but it was accompanied by orchestra and singers. The cast of the première included the soprano Cisse Vaughan and the mezzo-soprano Evelina Levi. The performance was a success, with "many curtain calls for the composer", and was judged as an "art jewel".

The cast included Graziella Gazzera Valle (Princess), Magda Piccarolo (Blue Fairy, Nightingale), Angelina Rossetti (Spindle, Duchess, Cat), Maria Benedetti (Queen, Cuckoo, Old lady), Vincenzo Capponi (Prince, Jester) and Egisto Busacchi (King, Woodcutter, Ambassador).

A further posthumous version, revised by Gian Luca Tocchi and by the widow of the composer, Elsa Respighi, was performed in the Teatro Rossini in Turin on 13 June 1967.

Roles

Instrumentation
La bella addormentata nel bosco (version 1922) is scored for the following instruments:

flute, oboe, clarinet, bassoon, horn, trumpet, trombone, triangle, drum, cymbals, bell, handbells, celesta, harpsichord, strings.

La bella dormente nel bosco (version 1934) is instead scored for the following instruments:

flute, oboe, English horn, clarinet, bassoon, horn, trumpet, trombone, piano, drum kit, strings.

Recordings

 Respighi: La bella dormente nel bosco Veta Pilipenko (La Regina/La Vecchietta/La Rana), Angela Nisi (La Principessa), Antonio Gandia (Il Principe Aprile), Vincenzo Taormina (Il Re/L'Ambasciatore), Shoushik Barsoumian (La Fata Azzurra), Lara Rotili (Il Gatto/La Duchessa/ Il Cucolo), Claudia Urru (Il Fuso/L'Usignolo), Orchestra e Coro del Teatro Lirico Di Cagliari, Donato Renzetti 2020 Naxos DVD Blu-Ray

References

Further reading
 

Operas
Italian-language operas
1922 operas
1934 operas
Operas by Ottorino Respighi
Operas based on literature
Operas based on works by Charles Perrault
Works based on Sleeping Beauty